The 1990 TFL Statewide League premiership season was an Australian rules football competition staged across Tasmania over 21 roster rounds and 6 finals series matches between 31 March and 22 September 1990.
The League was known as the Cascade-Boags Statewide League under a dual commercial naming-rights sponsorship agreement worth A$1.08 million over the following three years with both Cascade Brewery in Hobart and Boag's Brewery in Launceston.

Participating Clubs
Burnie Hawks Football Club
Clarence District Football Club
Devonport Blues Football Club
Glenorchy District Football Club
Hobart Football Club
New Norfolk District Football Club
North Hobart Football Club
North Launceston Football Club
Sandy Bay Football Club
South Launceston Football Club

1990 TFL Statewide League Club Coaches
Mark Scott (Burnie Hawks)
Peter Daniel (Clarence)
Peter Knights (Devonport)
Danny Ling (Glenorchy)
Mark Browning (Hobart)
Peter Chisnall (New Norfolk)
Roland Crosby (North Hobart)
Steven Goulding (North Launceston)
Shane Williams & Geoff Whitton (Sandy Bay)
Ricky Dolliver (South Launceston)

Medibank Private Cup (Reserves) Grand Final
Burnie Hawks 13.11 (89) v Glenorchy 9.9 (63) – North Hobart Oval

Tasmania Bank Colts (Under-19's) Grand Final
Nth Launceston 10.13 (73) v Glenorchy 10.4 (64) – North Hobart Oval

TFL Fourths (Under-17's) Grand Final
Clarence 10.11 (71) v Sandy Bay 9.17 (71) – KGV Football Park

TFL Fourths (Under-17's) Grand Final (Replay)

Leading Goalkickers: TFL Statewide League
Paul Dac (New Norfolk) – 103
Wayne Fox (Sth Launceston & Sandy Bay) – 88
Chris Reiwoldt (Clarence) – 77
Mark Williams (Devonport) – 71

Medal Winners
Ricky Hanlon (New Norfolk) – William Leitch Medal
Michael Winter (Hobart) – Darrel Baldock Medal (Best player in TFL Grand Final)
Jeffrey Wood (Devonport) – George Watt Medal (Reserves)
Drew Hall (Sandy Bay) – V.A Geard Medal (Under-19's)
Stephen Old (Clarence) – D.R Plaister Medal (Under-17's)
James Manson (Collingwood) – Lefroy Medal (Best player in State Match)

Interstate Matches
State Of Origin Match (Sunday, 24 June 1990) – (Tas-TV footage of Tasmania's 1990 State Of Origin victory) 
Tasmania 20.14 (134) v Victoria 14.17 (101) – Att: 18,651 at North Hobart Oval

Intrastate Matches
Intrastate Match (Sunday, 24 June 1990)
TFL 28.17 (185) v NTFL 10.5 (65) – Att: 18,651 at North Hobart Oval (State Of Origin Curtain Raiser)

1990 TFL Club Home Attendance Figures
Clarence: 23,692 for 11 matches at 2,153
Hobart: 17,744 for 10 matches at 1,774
Devonport: 17,722 for 10 matches at 1,772
New Norfolk: 18,718 for 11 matches at 1,701
Nth Hobart: 18,470 for 11 matches at 1,679
Nth Launceston: 16,513 for 10 matches at 1,651
Burnie Hawks: 17,276 for 11 matches at 1,570
Glenorchy: 14,198 for 10 matches at 1,419
Sandy Bay: 12,260 for 10 matches at 1,226
Sth Launceston: 8,401 for 11 matches at 763

1990 TFL Statewide League Ladder

Round 1
(Saturday, 31 March 1990)
Nth Hobart 10.15 (75) v Glenorchy 7.19 (61) – Att: 2,235 at North Hobart Oval
Hobart 13.15 (93) v Sandy Bay 9.13 (67) – Att: 1,652 at Queenborough Oval
New Norfolk 18.15 (123) v Devonport 14.12 (96) – Att: 1,201 at Boyer Oval
Sth Launceston 16.7 (103) v Nth Launceston 15.10 (100) – Att: 1,200 at Youngtown Memorial Ground
Burnie Hawks 15.11 (101) v Clarence 10.11 (71) – Att: 1,507 at West Park Oval

Round 2
(Saturday, 7 April 1990)
Hobart 15.17 (107) v New Norfolk 14.10 (94) – Att: 1,494 at North Hobart Oval
Clarence 17.14 (116) v Nth Hobart 15.5 (95) – Att: 2,394 at Bellerive Oval
Sandy Bay 17.12 (114) v Glenorchy 9.13 (67) – Att: 1,620 at KGV Football Park
Nth Launceston 18.18 (126) v Burnie Hawks 11.11 (77) – Att: 1,681 at York Park
Devonport 28.16 (184) v Sth Launceston 14.18 (102) – Att: 1,427 at Devonport Oval

Round 3
(Saturday, 14 April & Monday, 16 April 1990)
Nth Launceston 16.11 (107) v Nth Hobart 9.8 (62) – Att: 1,896 at North Hobart Oval
Sandy Bay 17.14 (116) v New Norfolk 12.16 (88) – Att: 1,427 at Boyer Oval
Hobart 18.21 (129) v Sth Launceston 15.9 (99) – Att: 856 at Youngtown Memorial Ground
Clarence 14.8 (92) v Glenorchy 11.9 (75) – Att: 2,500 at Bellerive Oval (Monday)
Burnie Hawks 24.20 (164) v Devonport 12.8 (80) – Att: 3,007 at West Park Oval (Monday)

Round 4
(Saturday, 21 April 1990)
Hobart 19.14 (128) v Burnie Hawks 14.16 (100) – Att: 1,645 at North Hobart Oval
Sandy Bay 20.14 (134) v Sth Launceston 10.14 (74) – Att: 823 at Queenborough Oval
New Norfolk 22.11 (143) v Glenorchy 19.12 (126) – Att: 1,663 at KGV Football Park
Clarence 14.8 (92) v Nth Launceston 9.19 (73) – Att: 1,707 at York Park
Devonport 14.8 (92) v Nth Hobart 12.14 (86) – Att: 1,477 at Devonport Oval

Round 5
(Saturday, 28 April 1990)
Hobart 25.19 (169) v Nth Hobart 16.12 (108) – Att: 2,308 at North Hobart Oval
Clarence 23.14 (152) v Devonport 16.7 (103) – Att: 1,408 at Bellerive Oval
Nth Launceston 14.18 (102) v Glenorchy 11.12 (78) – Att: 1,100 at KGV Football Park
New Norfolk 17.15 (117) v Sth Launceston 15.16 (106) – Att: 812 at Youngtown Memorial Ground
Burnie Hawks 15.18 (108) v Sandy Bay 8.14 (62) – Att: 1,433 at West Park Oval

Round 6
(Saturday, 5 May 1990)
Clarence 23.9 (147) v Hobart 10.9 (69) – Att: 3,344 at North Hobart Oval
Sandy Bay 26.12 (168) v Nth Hobart 10.6 (66) – Att: 1,356 at Queenborough Oval
New Norfolk 16.12 (108) v Burnie Hawks 15.18 (108) – Att: 1,584 at Boyer Oval
Sth Launceston 14.14 (98) v Glenorchy 13.16 (94) – Att: 738 at Youngtown Memorial Ground
Devonport 14.13 (97) v Nth Launceston 5.13 (43) – Att: 1,765 at Devonport Oval

Round 7
(Saturday, 12 May 1990)
New Norfolk 13.24 (102) v Nth Hobart 13.5 (83) – Att: 1,747 at North Hobart Oval
Clarence 12.13 (85) v Sandy Bay 8.15 (63) – Att: 2,164 at Bellerive Oval
Devonport 10.11 (71) v Glenorchy 7.5 (47) – Att: 966 at KGV Football Park
Nth Launceston 15.13 (103) v Hobart 7.15 (57) – Att: 1,530 at York Park
Burnie Hawks 23.10 (148) v Sth Launceston 7.17 (59) – Att: 1,147 at West Park Oval

Round 8
(Saturday, 19 May 1990)
Devonport 18.15 (123) v Hobart 9.13 (67) – Att: 1,328 at North Hobart Oval
Nth Launceston 18.12 (120) v Sandy Bay 8.11 (59) – Att: 1,055 at Queenborough Oval
New Norfolk 17.18 (120) v Clarence 16.11 (107) – Att: 2,607 at Boyer Oval
Nth Hobart 21.11 (137) v Sth Launceston 11.17 (83) – Att: 750 at Youngtown Memorial Ground
Burnie Hawks 17.21 (123) v Glenorchy 10.14 (74) – Att: 1,304 at West Park Oval

Round 9
(Saturday, 26 May 1990)
Nth Hobart 20.7 (127) v Burnie Hawks 14.13 (97) – Att: 1,481 at North Hobart Oval
Hobart 9.14 (68) v Glenorchy 5.5 (35) – Att: 1,694 at KGV Football Park
Clarence 32.20 (212) v Sth Launceston 4.3 (27) – Att: 1,396 at Bellerive Oval
Nth Launceston 22.20 (152) v New Norfolk 11.7 (73) – Att: 2,270 at York Park
Sandy Bay 13.18 (96) v Devonport 14.10 (94) – Att: 2,164 at Devonport Oval

Round 10
(Saturday, 2 June & Sunday, 3 June 1990)
Hobart 22.18 (150) v Sandy Bay 9.15 (69) – Att: 1,610 at North Hobart Oval
Nth Hobart 10.11 (71) v Glenorchy 9.15 (69) – Att: 1,628 at KGV Football Park
Clarence 20.23 (143) v Burnie Hawks 10.12 (72) – Att: 1,719 at Bellerive Oval
Devonport 15.19 (109) v New Norfolk 14.13 (97) – Att: 1,816 at Devonport Oval
Nth Launceston 28.20 (188) v Sth Launceston 7.10 (52) – Att: 2,349 at York Park (Sunday)

Round 11
(Saturday, 9 June. Sunday, 10 June & Monday, 11 June 1990)
Glenorchy 13.16 (94) v Sandy Bay 14.8 (92) – Att: 1,291 at Queenborough Oval (Saturday)
New Norfolk 20.17 (137) v Hobart 13.17 (95) – Att: 2,392 at Boyer Oval (Saturday)
Nth Launceston 19.11 (125) v Burnie Hawks 17.14 (116) – Att: 1,716 at West Park Oval (Saturday)
Devonport 29.12 (186) v Sth Launceston 13.14 (92) – Att: 1,037 at Youngtown Memorial Ground (Sunday)
Clarence 23.16 (154) v Nth Hobart 13.10 (88) – Att: 2,919 at North Hobart Oval (Monday)

Round 12
(Saturday, 16 June & Sunday, 17 June 1990)
Hobart 27.23 (185) v Sth Launceston 12.13 (85) – Att: 990 at North Hobart Oval
New Norfolk 20.11 (131) v Sandy Bay 12.22 (94) – Att: 1,159 at Queenborough Oval
Clarence 16.22 (118) v Glenorchy 14.13 (97) – Att: 1,798 at KGV Football Park
Nth Launceston 11.13 (79) v Nth Hobart 8.6 (54) – Att: 1,154 at York Park
Burnie Hawks 16.15 (111) v Devonport 13.13 (91) – Att: 4,013 at Devonport Oval (Sunday)

Round 13
(Saturday, 30 June & Sunday, 1 July 1990)
Devonport 18.15 (123) v Nth Hobart 15.15 (105) – Att: 1,230 at North Hobart Oval
Clarence 22.16 (148) v Nth Launceston 7.14 (56) – Att: 2,409 at Bellerive Oval
New Norfolk 22.12 (144) v Glenorchy 13.6 (84) – Att: 2,125 at Boyer Oval
Burnie Hawks 9.10 (64) v Hobart 7.9 (51) – Att: 1,066 at West Park Oval
Sandy Bay 22.15 (147) v Sth Launceston 13.15 (93) – Att: 783 at York Park (Sunday)

Round 14
(Saturday, 7 July 1990)
Nth Hobart 7.12 (54) v Hobart 6.12 (48) – Att: 1,090 at North Hobart Oval
Sandy Bay 6.6 (42) v Burnie Hawks 3.7 (25) – Att: 708 at Queenborough Oval
New Norfolk 12.14 (86) v Sth Launceston 2.5 (17) – Att: 982 at Boyer Oval
Glenorchy 14.12 (96) v Nth Launceston 9.10 (64) – Att: 1,061 at York Park
Clarence 14.12 (96) v Devonport 8.9 (57) – Att: 1,677 at Devonport Oval

Round 15
(Saturday, 14 July 1990)
Hobart 13.23 (101) v Clarence 11.12 (78) – Att: 2,136 at Bellerive Oval
Sandy Bay 16.8 (104) v Nth Hobart 14.12 (96) – Att: 1,508 at North Hobart Oval
Glenorchy 24.18 (162) v Sth Launceston 18.14 (122) – Att: 1,135 at KGV Football Park
Nth Launceston 14.13 (97) v Devonport 12.8 (80) – Att: 1,352 at York Park
New Norfolk 18.19 (127) v Burnie Hawks 16.16 (112) – Att: 1,370 at West Park Oval

Round 16
(Saturday, 21 July & Sunday, 22 July 1990)
Hobart 13.11 (89) v Nth Launceston 11.13 (79) – Att: 1,608 at North Hobart Oval
Sandy Bay 15.9 (99) v Clarence 12.15 (87) – Att: 1,587 at Queenborough Oval
New Norfolk 14.15 (99) v Nth Hobart 9.4 (58) – Att: 1,913 at Boyer Oval
Glenorchy 14.12 (96) v Devonport 11.10 (76) – Att: 1,333 at Devonport Oval
Burnie Hawks 22.16 (148) v Sth Launceston 13.9 (87) – Att: 545 at York Park (Sunday)

Round 17
(Saturday, 28 July 1990)
Nth Hobart 21.19 (145) v Sth Launceston 14.6 (90) – Att: 858 at North Hobart Oval
Glenorchy 18.10 (118) v Burnie Hawks 14.17 (101) – Att: 1,233 at KGV Football Park
Clarence 17.15 (117) v New Norfolk 15.9 (99) – Att: 4,697 at Bellerive Oval
Nth Launceston 18.8 (116) v Sandy Bay 13.14 (92) – Att: 1,666 at York Park
Hobart 13.20 (98) v Devonport 9.11 (65) – Att: 1,177 at Devonport Oval

Round 18
(Saturday, 4 August 1990)
Hobart 22.14 (146) v Glenorchy 7.12 (54) – Att: 1,908 at North Hobart Oval
Sandy Bay 12.10 (82) v Devonport 10.12 (72) – Att: 900 at Queenborough Oval
Nth Launceston 13.15 (93) v New Norfolk 12.10 (82) – Att: 1,705 at Boyer Oval
Clarence 20.17 (137) v Sth Launceston 12.7 (79) – Att: 544 at York Park
Burnie Hawks 21.15 (141) v Nth Hobart 12.13 (85) – Att: 1,743 at West Park Oval

Round 19
(Saturday, 11 August & Sunday, 12 August 1990)
Nth Hobart 13.24 (102) v Glenorchy 11.13 (79) – Att: 1,418 at North Hobart Oval
Sandy Bay 10.7 (67) v Hobart 9.6 (60) – Att: 1,729 at Queenborough Oval
New Norfolk 10.11 (71) v Devonport 5.16 (46) – Att: 1,258 at KGV Football Park *
Burnie Hawks 24.12 (156) v Clarence 19.9 (123) – Att: 1,477 at West Park Oval
Nth Launceston 20.17 (137) v Sth Launceston 3.6 (24) – Att: 520 at York Park (Sunday)
Note: Match switched to KGV due to flooding at Boyer Oval.

Round 20
(Saturday, 18 August 1990)
Hobart 21.22 (148) v New Norfolk 15.10 (100) – Att: 2,727 at North Hobart Oval
Sandy Bay 24.21 (165) v Glenorchy 15.8 (98) – Att: 1,361 at KGV Football Park *
Clarence 19.21 (135) v Nth Hobart 10.10 (70) – Att: 1,522 at Bellerive Oval
Nth Launceston 26.11 (167) v Burnie Hawks 12.7 (79) – Att: 1,743 at York Park
Devonport 30.14 (194) v Sth Launceston 13.8 (86) – Att: 873 at Devonport Oval
Note: Wayne Fox (Sandy Bay) registers his 1000th TFL goal, 22 minutes into the first quarter.

Round 21
(Saturday, 25 August & Sunday, 26 August 1990)
Nth Launceston 9.20 (74) v Nth Hobart 3.8 (26) – Att: 870 at North Hobart Oval
Clarence 18.12 (120) v Glenorchy 7.3 (45) – Att: 1,347 at Bellerive Oval
Sandy Bay 10.13 (73) v New Norfolk 2.11 (23) – Att: 1,524 at Boyer Oval
Hobart 31.17 (203) v Sth Launceston 15.21 (111) – Att: 616 at York Park
Devonport 14.13 (97) v Burnie Hawks 13.12 (90) – Att: 1,506 at West Park Oval (Sunday)

Qualifying Final
(Saturday, 1 September 1990)
Nth Launceston: 4.2 (26) | 7.7 (49) | 14.10 (94) | 17.13 (115)
Hobart: 4.4 (28) | 8.7 (55) | 12.11 (83) | 15.13 (103)
Attendance: 4,282 at York Park

Elimination Final
(Sunday, 2 September 1990)
Sandy Bay: 5.6 (36) | 11.8 (74) | 18.15 (123) | 24.21 (165)
New Norfolk: 5.0 (30) | 9.2 (56) | 9.3 (57) | 12.4 (76)
Attendance: 4,765 at North Hobart Oval

Second Semi Final
(Saturday, 8 September 1990)
Nth Launceston: 6.5 (41) | 7.8 (50) | 14.12 (96) | 16.18 (114)
Clarence: 3.4 (22) | 7.8 (50) | 8.11 (59) | 12.12 (84)
Attendance: 4,206 at North Hobart Oval

First Semi Final
(Sunday, 9 September 1990)
Hobart: 7.4 (46) | 14.7 (91) | 19.10 (124) | 20.12 (132)
Sandy Bay: 7.0 (42) | 9.3 (57) | 12.4 (76) | 15.9 (99)
Attendance: 4,017 at North Hobart Oval

Preliminary Final
(Saturday, 15 September 1990)
Hobart: 4.3 (27) | 9.7 (61) | 10.11 (71) | 15.15 (105)
Clarence: 3.4 (22) | 5.6 (36) | 12.11 (83) | 13.12 (90)
Attendance: 5,669 at North Hobart Oval

Grand Final
(Saturday, 22 September 1990) (ABC-TV highlights: 1990 TFL Grand Final)
Hobart: 1.4 (10) | 5.8 (38) | 9.10 (64) | 19.16 (130)
Nth Launceston: 3.3 (21) | 6.6 (42) | 9.10 (64) | 10.12 (72)
Attendance: 15,633 at North Hobart Oval

Tasmanian Football League seasons